Ole Paulsen is the current Chair of Physiology (1883) in the Department of Physiology, Development and Neuroscience at the University of Cambridge.
 
Paulsen holds a medical degree and a doctorate from the University of Oslo. He   was appointed Departmental Lecturer  in the Department of Pharmacology, Oxford, in 1994. He was appointed University Lecturer in the University Laboratory of Physiology in 2000, along with  a Fellowship at Keble College. He was also   head of the  Neuronal Oscillations Group.

In January 2010 he was appointed to the Chair of Physiology (1883) in the Department of Physiology, Development and Neuroscience at the University of Cambridge.

References 

Year of birth missing (living people)
Living people
University of Oslo alumni
Fellows of St John's College, Cambridge
Academics of the University of Oxford
Norwegian physiologists
Professors of Physiology (Cambridge)